Margaritifera is a genus of freshwater mussels, aquatic bivalve molluscs in the family Margaritiferidae, the freshwater pearl mussels.

Species
Species within the genus Margaritifera include:
 Margaritifera auricularia or Pseudunio auricularia
 Margaritifera falcata (Gould, 1850)
 Margaritifera hembeli (Conrad, 1838)
 Margaritifera margaritifera (Linnaeus, 1758) — Freshwater pearl mussel (includes Margaritifera margaritifera durrovensis Phillips, 1928) 
 Margaritifera marrianae R. I. Johnson, 1983
The following fossil species are known from the mid-Cretaceous of Mongolia, being formerly classified in the genus Unio:

 †Margaritifera elongata (Martinson, 1982)
 †Margaritifera sainshandensis (Martinson, 1982)
 †Margaritifera glabra (Kolesnikov, 1956)

References)

 Starobogatov, Y. I. (1970). Fauna Molliuskov i Zoogeograficheskoe Raionirovanie Kontinental'nykh Vodoemov Zemnogo Shara [The Molluscan Fauna and Zoogeographical Zoning of the Continental Water Bodies of the World]. Nauka. Leningrad. 372 p., 12 tables.
 Ma, Q.-H. (1996). Revision of Mesozoic Margaritiferidae in China and their development. Acta Palaeontologica Sinica. 35(4): 408-429.

External links
 Schumacher, C. F. (1815). Afhandling over conchyliologiske systemer, og om nogle toskallede conchylier. Oversigt over det Kongelige Danske Videnskabernes Selskabs Forhandlinger (Bulletin de l'Académie Royale des Sciences et des Lettres de Danemark). 1813-1815: 7
 Schumacher, C. F. (1817). Essai d'un nouveau système des habitations des vers testacés. Schultz, Copenghagen. iv + 288 pp., 22 pls.
 Fagot, P. (1890-1894). Histoire malacologique des Pyrénées Françaises et Espagnoles. Bulletin de la Société Ramond
  Bolotov I.N., Vikhrev I.V., Bespalaya Y.V., Gofarov M.Y., Kondakov A.V., Konopleva E.S., Bolotov N.N. & Lyubas A.A. (2016). Multi-locus fossil-calibrated phylogeny, biogeography and a subgeneric revision of the Margaritiferidae (Mollusca: Bivalvia: Unionoida). Molecular Phylogenetics and Evolution. 103: 104-121

 
Bivalve genera

Extant Cretaceous first appearances